California's 47th State Assembly district is one of 80 California State Assembly districts. It is currently represented by Republican Greg Wallis.

District location 
The district is located in the heart of the Inland Empire. This heavily Latino district is anchored by Fontana, while Rialto and San Bernardino also comprise sizable portions of its population.

San Bernardino County – 23.1%
 Bloomington
 Colton
 Grand Terrace
 Fontana
 Muscoy
 Rialto
 San Bernardino – 32.0%

Election results from statewide races

List of Assembly Members 
Due to redistricting, the 47th district has been moved around different parts of the state. The current iteration resulted from the 2011 redistricting by the California Citizens Redistricting Commission.

Election results 1992 - present

2020

2018

2016

2014

2012

2010

2008

2006

2004

2002

2000

1998

1996

1994

1992

See also 
 California State Assembly
 California State Assembly districts
 Districts in California

References

External links 
 District map from the California Citizens Redistricting Commission

47
Government of San Bernardino County, California
Colton, California
Fontana, California
Rialto, California
San Bernardino, California
Inland Empire